The term "knowledge commons" refers to information, data, and content that is collectively owned and managed by a community of users, particularly over the Internet. What distinguishes a knowledge commons from a commons of shared physical resources is that digital resources are non-subtractible; that is, multiple users can access the same digital resources with no effect on their quantity or quality.

Conceptual background 

The term 'commons' is derived from the medieval economic system the commons. The knowledge commons is a model for a number of domains, including Open Educational Resources such as the MIT OpenCourseWare, free digital media such as Wikipedia, Creative Commons–licensed art, open-source research, and open scientific collections such as the Public Library of Science or the Science Commons, free software and Open Design. According to research by Charlotte Hess and Elinor Ostrom, the conceptual background of the knowledge commons encompasses two intellectual histories: first, a European tradition of battling the enclosure of the "intangible commons of the mind", threatened by expanding intellectual property rights and privatization of knowledge. Second, a tradition rooted in the United States, which sees the knowledge commons as a shared space allowing for free speech and democratic practices, and which is in the tradition of the town commons movement and commons-based production of scholarly work, open science, open libraries, and collective action.

The production of works in the knowledge commons is often driven by collective intelligence respectively the wisdom of crowds and is related to knowledge communism  as it was defined by Robert K. Merton, according to whom scientists give up intellectual property rights in exchange for recognition and esteem.

Ferenc Gyuris argues, that it is important to distinguish "information" from "knowledge" in defining the term "knowledge commons". He argues that "knowledge as a shared resource" requires that both information must become accessible and potential recipients must become able and willing to internalize it as 'knowledge'. "Therefore, knowledge cannot become a shared resource without a complex set of institutions and practices that give the opportunity to potential recipients to gain the necessary abilities and willingness".

Copyleft 
Copyleft licenses are institutions which support a knowledge commons of executable software. Copyleft licenses grant licensees all necessary rights such as right to study, use, change and redistribute—under the condition that all future works building on the license are again kept in the commons. Popular applications of the 'copyleft' principle are the GNU Software Licenses (GPL, LGPL and GFDL by Free Software Foundation) and the share-alike licenses under creative commons.

See also 
 Commons
 Commons-based peer production
 Digital commons (economics)
 Information commons
 Noogenesis
 Open content
 Open Knowledge Foundation
 Open source
 Open source appropriate technology
 Open-design movement
 OpenCourseWare
 Public ownership
 Robert K. Merton

Notes

External links 

 
 
 
 
 First Thematic Conference on the Knowledge Commons held in 2012 on the theme of "Governing Pooled Knowledge Resources: Building Institutions for Sustainable Scientific, Cultural and Genetic Resource Commons"
 Free/Libre Open Knowledge Society, designing a world for the commons.: A Free, Libre, Open Knowledge society is about to be built in Ecuador.
 Governing Knowledge Commons. 2014. Edited by Brett Frischmann, Mike Madison, and Katherine Strandburg. Oxford University Press.
 "Tragedy revisited" by Robert Boyd, Peter J. Richerson, Ruth Meinzen-Dick, Tine De Moor, Matthew O. Jackson, Kristina M. Gjerde, Harriet Harden-Davies,   Brett M. Frischmann, Michael J. Madison, Katherine J. Strandburg, Angela R McLean, Christopher Dye. Science, 14 Dec 2018, 362:6420, pp. 1236-1241. DOI: 10.1126/science.aaw0911
How to Reap the Benefits of the “Digital Revolution”? Modularity and the Commons. 2019. By Vasilis Kostakis, published in Halduskultuur: The Estonian Journal of Administrative Culture and Digital Governance, Vol 20(1):4–19.

Public commons
Open content
Social information processing
Intellectual property law
Economics of intellectual property
Knowledge economy
Free culture movement